Grebenișu de Câmpie is a commune in Mureș County, Transylvania, Romania. It is composed of three villages: Grebenișu de Câmpie, Leorința (Lőrinci), and Valea Sânpetrului (Szentpéterivölgy).

The commune lies in the Transylvanian Plain, on the banks of the Hârtoape creek (a tributary of the river Lechința).

References

Communes in Mureș County
Localities in Transylvania